Bird's Point is a resort village in the Canadian province of Saskatchewan within Census Division No. 5. It is on the shores of Round Lake in the Rural Municipality of Fertile Belt No. 183. It is in the eastern portion of the Qu'Appelle Valley.

History 
Bird's Point incorporated as a resort village on September 1, 1981.

Demographics 

Government 
The Resort Village of Bird's Point is governed by an elected municipal council and an appointed administrator that meets on the second Monday of every month. The mayor is Alice Davis and its administrator is Alita Stevenson.

Bird's Point Recreation Site 
Bird's Point Recreation Site is a provincial campround at Bird's Point on the shore of Round Lake. The campground has amenities such as a boat launch, sandy beach, picnic area, showers and washrooms, a gazebo, and a fish cleaning station.

See also 
List of communities in Saskatchewan
List of municipalities in Saskatchewan
List of resort villages in Saskatchewan
List of villages in Saskatchewan
List of summer villages in Alberta

References 

Resort villages in Saskatchewan
Fertile Belt No. 183, Saskatchewan
Division No. 5, Saskatchewan